Benzion Shalom Eliezer Freshwater (born 1948) is a British billionaire property investor of Haredi Jewish descent.

Early life
Benzion Shalom Eliezer Freshwater is the son of Osias Freshwater (1897–1976), born in the village of Sassov, Galicia, Poland, who emigrated to England in 1939. His wife and three children were murdered in the Holocaust. In 1947 he married Nechama Golda Stempel née Halberstam, widowed daughter of Rabbi Ben Zion Halberstam, the second Bobover Rebbe, and they had two sons, Benzion and Solomon. Osias built up Daejan Holdings into one of London's largest private landlords and his sons, Benzion and Rabbi Shlomo are now Executive Directors.

Career
He has 279 directorships but operates mainly through Daejan Holdings plc, a company quoted on the London Stock Exchange, in which his family has a 79% stake. Daejan's UK portfolio is managed by Highdorn, part of the Freshwater Group of Companies.

In the Sunday Times Rich List his fortune has risen from £1 billion in 2009 to £1.6 billion in 2016. According to the 2020 edition his net worth was estimated at £2.054 billion.

He is a trustee of Mayfair Charities Limited, a registered charity which disbursed  £8,553,000 in 2007-8 to "organisations and institutions engaged in the provision of education and promotion of religious observance within the tenets of orthodox Judaism and for the relief of poverty."

References

External links
 Daejan Holdings plc website

1948 births
Living people
British real estate businesspeople
British Orthodox Jews
Jewish British philanthropists
People from Golders Green
British billionaires
British people of Polish-Jewish descent